Amblyseius gramineous is a species of mite in the family Phytoseiidae.

References

gramineous
Articles created by Qbugbot
Animals described in 1992